Kristoff Vernard (formerly known as Kristoff von Doom and Dr. Doom) is a fictional character appearing in American comic books published by Marvel Comics. The adoptive son of Victor von Doom and biological son of Nathaniel Richards (and half-brother of Reed Richards), and direct ancestor of Kang the Conqueror/Rama-Tut/Immortus/Scarlet Centurion/Iron Lad, he has been involved mainly with the Fantastic Four, as an enemy, ally and even short-term member.

Publication history
Kristoff first appeared in John Byrne's "back to the basics" Fantastic Four run in issue #247 in October 1982. Kristoff served as heir to Doctor Doom, occasional ruler of Latveria, a probationary member of the Fantastic Four, and temporal adventurer alongside Nathaniel Richards.

The character next appears in Fantastic Four #258-259 (September–October 1983) and first appears as the second Doctor Doom in Fantastic Four #278-279 (May–June 1985).  After a few scattered appearances, Kristoff Vernard becomes a semi-regular cast member in Fantastic Four #400 (May 1995). He recently reappeared in FF #2,  ruling Latveria in Doom's absence. 

An alternate future version appeared as an adult in the MC2 universe, beginning in A-Next #5 (1998), followed by scattered appearances, but was only featured regularly in Fantastic Five #1-5 (September–November 2007).

Doctor Doom received an entry in the Official Handbook of the Marvel Universe Update '89 #2, and the All-New Official Handbook of the Marvel Universe A-Z #12 (2007).

Fictional character biography

Heir
After being ousted as leader of Latveria, Dr. Doom returned to the country with the Fantastic Four to overthrow its then-leader, Zorba. Doom met the young Kristoff and his mother. While conversing with them, Kristoff's mother was killed by one of Zorba's robots for violating curfew. Furious at the death of a woman who was standing in his presence and therefore should have been regarded as being under his protection, Doom destroyed the robot and defeated Zorba. Dr. Doom adopted Kristoff as his heir and took him to live in Castle Doom.

Second Coming of Doom

Following the apparent murder of Dr. Doom by Terrax, Doom's robots took Kristoff and brainwashed and implanted within him Doom's mental patterns and detailed memories. However, he stopped the process before all of Doom's memories could be implanted (after his intellect had been duplicated).

Now believing that he was the real Doom, Kristoff's first action was attempting to destroy the Fantastic Four by blowing up the Baxter Building, a plan drawn from memories of the real Dr. Doom's plot to kill the FF while he was teamed with the Sub-Mariner. The FF survived the explosion thanks to the force fields of Sue Richards, something Kristoff had not anticipated because he had stopped the memory transfer at a point before Sue Richards had fully developed her force field abilities. The FF quickly traveled to Doomstadt and defeated their adversary. To the team's surprise, the armor held not Doom but a child, whom the team took with them.

Kristoff would be imprisoned in Four Freedoms Plaza, the new home of the Four, following his destruction of the Baxter Building. He was still convinced that he was Doom and Mister Fantastic hoped to restore him to his normal personality. At this time the real Dr. Doom "returned from the dead".

Kristoff would free himself with the aid of a Doombot sent to kidnap Franklin Richards, son of Mister Fantastic and the Invisible Woman, by the recently resurrected Dr. Doom. Doom wanted to use Franklin as a bargaining chip for the soul of his mother which was held captive by Mephisto. Although still a child of about four or five, Franklin had powerful psychic powers which had enabled him to defeat Mephisto in a previous encounter. This time, Doom's power inhibitors prevented Franklin from fighting the demon, who agreed to the bargain. But at that very moment, Kristoff, in full armor, burst in with an army of Doombots and challenged Doom, whom he thought to be an impostor.

The FF, who had followed Kristoff in order to rescue Franklin, intervened and Mister Fantastic used a device of his own to enable his son to fight back against Mephisto. As the two Dooms battled, the Doombots stood by, unsure which to aid since they both claimed to be Doom and the brainscans seemed to confirm this.

The battle soon ended but Doom's mother was still not free. Her imprisonment in the nether realms was one of the few failures that Doom would admit to and he said as much to those present. The robots perceived this as doubt and a lack of confidence meaning Kristoff could only be the real ever-confident Dr. Doom. The Doombots turned on their creator and Dr. Doom was forced to flee.

Kristoff ruled Latveria as Doom  once again, where he would encounter the West Coast Avengers.  To their surprise, he let them leave Latveria.  He stayed the regent until the original infiltrated the Castle and uttered a codeword that reverted Kristoff to his original personality.  Doom reclaimed his throne while Kristoff was sent as a decoy to battle Mr. Fantastic. He was killed and placed in stasis in a Tibetan Monastery.

Life After Doom
Nathaniel Richards revived Kristoff  along with Boris, Doom's former guardian, who was actually the Tomorrow Man in disguise. The former dictator returned with Richards and the Invisible Woman, where he became a closely monitored member of the Fantastic Four, and close friends with Cassandra Lang, daughter of Ant-Man (Scott Lang) who had also joined the team following the "death" of Mister Fantastic. He eventually took his leave from the group to go with Nathaniel Richards. He was reunited with Doom  when the alternate future offspring of Franklin Richards and Rachel Summers called Hyperstorm, attacked the Fantastic Four  where he chose to help them instead of attacking them at their weakest. The group defeated Hyperstorm.

Following the Onslaught saga, Kristoff and Nathaniel tried to collect the now-missing FF's equipment located in the Negative Zone. They then returned to Latveria, Kristoff with hopes of assuming the throne once again, but they were met with resistance by the Dreadknight and found Doombots in charge. The duo were then tricked by S.H.I.E.L.D. into defeating them. 

Kristoff and Nathaniel were later displaced by Stryfe after his ship crashed into Castle Doom.

Nathaniel Richards has hinted that he is Kristoff's father, which gives something of an irony that Doctor Doom chose, as his heir, the half-brother of his most hated rival.

At the start of Fantastic Four: Three, Doom was making plans to abdicate his throne and give it to Kristoff, who is referred to as living in "exile".

Kristoff was then revealed to be the villain in the Spider-Man/Fantastic Four miniseries, setting up an elaborate plan to depose Doom and take his place- such as setting up a riot at the Latverian embassy in the past so that he could read some books of magic that Doom had lost in the present, acquiring samples of the Venom symbiote in order to create a 'symbiote bomb' that he could secretly 'sell' to Doom to take him out of the picture- culminating in him seeking the aid of Spider-Man and the Fantastic Four to help in his final plan, regarding them as Doom's greatest enemies. Spider-Man was an 'honorary' member of the FF as he is invariably the first person the team turns to when they require either general outside assistance or just someone to socialise with. Although Kristoff attacks them when they turn him down, claiming that they were willing to just 'forget' him after the Onslaught incident, Spider-Man and the Thing discover an old family photo album which includes pictures of Kristoff's time with the team, the Thing explaining that they have actually never stopped trying to find Kristoff but had long ago run out of ideas about where to actively look. Their original search had failed because Kristoff was hiding away in training. Despite this, Kristoff rejects the team and departs in anger, swearing to destroy Doom himself.

At one point, Doom loses part of his intelligence during "Fall of the Hulks". In turn, he calls in Vernard from exile to rule Latveria for him while he advises in the shadows. With the help of the Fantastic Four, Doom regains his full intelligence by transporting a part of Doom's backup memories that are contained in Vernard's head.

He is subsequently living in Latveria with Doctor Doom, who continues to groom him to be his heir.

For a point, Vernard and Valeria seem to both be living in Latveria at the same time.

Kristoff Vernard assists his father in preparing for the events of Secret Wars, including having dinner with Reed (in an attempt to gather information), fighting off an incursion, having dinner with Namor, and observing Doom's preparations.

Kristoff Vernard then hired She-Hulk as his lawyer to apply for political asylum in the United States, but end up facing a small army of Doombots. After defeating the Doombots, She-Hulk succeeds in granting him political asylum only for Doctor Doom to break into the courthouse and kidnap him. She-Hulk then goes to Latveria to rescue Kristoff only for him and Doctor Doom to have a pep-talk, where he expresses his desire to follow his own path in life. After the talk, Doom allows Kristoff and She-Hulk to leave Latveria.

Later on, after Doom is momentarily deposed from his throne, Kristoff is summoned back among others to test his loyalty to Doom. He passed immediately, but was then told to "never call [him] father again".

Vernard may have been present during the confrontation against Ionela Novothy, the Symkarian "ringleader" of the coup against Doom. When the war concluded and Symkaria was annexed into Latveria, Doom installed Kristoff as governor of what is now the southern region of Latveria.

Powers and abilities
Kristoff Vernard has no superpowers but he's a skilled scientist and magician. He has also worn a suit of armor that grants him some degree of superhuman strength and durability, flight and energy projection.

Other versions

Franklin Richards: Son of a Genius
In the non-canonical humor comic Franklin Richards: Son of a Genius, Kristoff is depicted as a foreign exchange classmate of Franklin's from Latveria making him roughly the same age as him. He shows total admiration for Doctor Doom and much like his idol shows some disdain for the son of his archenemy. Franklin appears to be oblivious to Kristoff's antagonism and believes that he is his genuine friend.

House of M

Kristoff was a member of Doom's Fearsome Four, as the Inhuman Torch. In the crafted world, Kristoff was the adopted son of Valeria and Doom, and thanks to the cosmic experimentation of his adoptive father, had the abilities of Johnny Storm.

MC2
In the MC2 universe, Kristoff appears as an ally of the A-Next and the Fantastic Five. He uses the name "Doom" and has requested membership in the Fantastic Five. He is later shown to have indeed gained membership. His costume is a combination of his old mask and a green version of the F5 uniform.

In other media

Video games
 In the Heroes and Villains expansion pack for Marvel: Ultimate Alliance, Kristoff Vernard is an alternate costume for Doctor Doom.

Notes
John Byrne revealed his original plans for Kristoff, stating "I intended Doom to return to Latvaria and absolutely FREAK OUT when he discovered what his robots had done to Kristoff. Basically -- he'd need a whole lot of new robots by the time he calmed down. And then he would devote a whole lot of time and energy to restoring Kristoff. (I had not decided if he would be successful. Part of my brain wanted him to realize he needed the help of the other smartest guy on the planet -- and there was no way he could ever go there!")

See also
 Doctor Doom

References

Marvel Comics supervillains
Marvel Comics superheroes
Marvel Comics male supervillains
Marvel Comics male superheroes
Marvel Comics 2
Latverians
Characters created by John Byrne (comics)
Comics characters introduced in 1982
Doctor Doom
Marvel Comics scientists
Superheroes who are adopted
Marvel Comics characters who use magic
Fantastic Four